Pt. Deendayal Upadhyay Memorial Health Sciences and Ayush University of Chhattisgarh, formerly Pt. Deendayal Upadhyay Memorial University, is a state university located in Raipur, Chhattisgarh, India. It was established under the Ayush And Health Science University Of Chhattisgarh. Act with establishment date of 16 September 2008.

Degrees

The university offers Bachelor of Science in Nursing (BScN), Bachelor of Medicine, Bachelor of Surgery (MBBS), Bachelor of Dental Surgery (BDS), Master of Dental Surgery (MDS), Doctor of Medicine−MD,and Bachelor of Physiotherapy (BPT)coursework.

See also
University Grants Commission (India)

References 

Medical and health sciences universities in India
Medical colleges in Chhattisgarh
Education in Raipur, Chhattisgarh
Government universities and colleges in India
Nursing schools in India
Universities in Chhattisgarh
2008 establishments in Chhattisgarh
Educational institutions established in 2008
Memorials to Deendayal Upadhyay
Public medical universities